Sir Robert Peel, 3rd Baronet, GCB, PC (4 May 1822 – 9 May 1895) was a British Peelite, Liberal and from 1884 until 1886 Conservative Member of Parliament (MP).

Eldest son of the prime minister Robert Peel, he was educated at Harrow and Christ Church, Oxford and entered the Diplomatic Service in 1844. He served as co-member for Tamworth, his father's constituency, from 1850 until 1880, for Huntingdon from 1884 and for Blackburn from 1885 to 1886. 

He was appointed Irish secretary in 1861 in Palmerston's ministry, but in 1865, under Russell he was replaced by Chichester Fortescue. He was appointed a GCB in 1866. 

His variety of parties and tendency not to toe the party line saw republication of a charge of moral want, volatility and 'lack of dignity' from pre-Liberal landslide biographies after his death such as the Oxford Dictionary of National Biography which mention signs of general profligacy and of his rift from his wife.

Background and education
Born in London on 4 May 1822, Peel was the eldest son of Sir Robert Peel, 2nd Baronet, the statesman, and Julia, daughter of Sir John Floyd, 1st Baronet. He went to Harrow School in February 1835. He matriculated from Christ Church, Oxford on 26 May 1841, but did not take a degree.

Diplomatic career
Entering the diplomatic service, he became an attaché to the British legation at Madrid on 18 June 1844. He was promoted to be secretary of legation in Switzerland on 2 May 1846, and was chargé d'affaires there in November 1846. On his father's death, on 2 July 1850, and his own succession to the baronetcy, he resigned his office at Bern.

Political career
Entering the House of Commons as the 'Liberal-Conservative' (i.e. as one of the Peelites) member for his father's former constituency, Tamworth, on 19 July 1850, he had every opportunity open to him of taking a distinguished place in public life. He had a fine presence and gaiety of manner, and was popular in social life; while his oratorical gifts – a rich ringing voice, a perfect command of language, rare powers of irony, a capacity for producing unexpected rhetorical effects – ought to have rendered his success in parliament a certainty. But he used his abilities fitfully. The want of moral fibre in his volatile character, an absence of dignity, and an inability to accept a fixed political creed, prevented him from acquiring the confidence of his associates or of the public.

On 24 April 1854 he was shipwrecked off the coast of Genoa in the SS Ercolano, and only saved his life by swimming ashore on some portion of the wreck. From 29 March 1854 to 1859 he served as a captain in the Staffordshire Yeomanry. In March 1855 Lord Palmerston, who had been Secretary of State for Foreign Affairs while Peel was in the diplomatic service, appointed him a junior Civil Lord of the Admiralty. Henceforth he was regarded as a Liberal, and his persistent advocacy of the liberation of Italy fully justified this view of his political opinions.

In July 1856 he acted as secretary to Lord Granville's special mission to Russia at the coronation of Alexander II. On 5 January 1857, during a lecture delivered at the opening of the new library at Adderley Park, near Birmingham, he spoke discourteously of the Russian court and the court officials. The lecture, severely commented on by the Russian and French press, was the subject of a parliamentary debate, and caused great annoyance to the English court.

Nevertheless, on Palmerston's return to power, he, on 26 July 1861, made Peel Chief Secretary for Ireland and a privy councillor. In this position his careless good humour pleased the Irish and the prime minister, and he almost thought he had solved the Irish question when he made excursions incognito through the country on a jaunting-car and interviewed the peasants. His speeches were very optimistic; but, before his connection with the castle ended, fenianism came to a head. Irish debates became more embittered, and his replies and speeches in parliament lacked discretion and were not calculated to promote peace. In February 1862 he received a challenge from the O'Donoghue, but the matter was brought before the commons on 25 February and was adjusted. Although he took a warm interest in some Irish questions, especially higher education, which he had aided by a handsome contribution to the Queen's Colleges founded by his father, his career in Ireland was a failure. When the Liberal government was reconstituted, after the death of Lord Palmerston, by Lord John Russell, to whom Peel's failings were peculiarly obnoxious his post was filled by Chichester Fortescue and he did not again hold office. On 5 January 1866 he was created G.C.B.

He continued to sit for Tamworth as a Liberal, but was often a severe critic of Mr. Gladstone's policy. In 1871 he gave a remarkable proof of his eloquence by describing to the House the rout, which he had himself witnessed, of the French army of General Bourbaki, and its flight over the Swiss frontier in the depth of winter during the Franco-Prussian War. In 1874 he for a second time christened himself a Liberal-Conservative; and when the eastern question, during Lord Beaconsfield's administration, came to the front, he wholly separated himself from the followers of Mr. Gladstone. He did not stand for Tamworth at the general election in 1880, but unsuccessfully contested Gravesend in the conservative interest; and his voice was often heard on Conservative platforms, denouncing the action of the Liberal administration in Egypt and Ireland. In The Times of 8 May 1880 he published a letter, in which he recounted the offers from various governments of honours and offices which he had refused. On 21 March 1884 he was returned as a Conservative member for Huntingdon. When that borough was disfranchised, he was, in November 1885, returned for Blackburn.

On the critical division on the second reading of the Home Rule Bill, on 7 June 1886, he abstained from voting. At the general election in the following July Peel contested the Inverness Burghs for the Liberal party against a Liberal Unionist who had broken with his party on the issue of Home Rule. Peel was not successful. Subsequently, with characteristic impetuosity, he threw himself into the home rule agitation as a supporter of the Irish demands, and at a by-election in 1889 was the Liberal candidate for Brighton, duly advocating (Irish) home rule. Neither of the incumbents returned had been Liberals since the election of 1880 but the by-election was expected to be a closer affair, and polling 39.3% of the vote, he decided not to stand again to be an MP.

Horse racing
From about 1856 he was extensively engaged in racing under the name of Mr. F. Robinson; and later on had an establishment at Bonehill, near Tamworth, where he bred horses.

Later life
However, in later life his private circumstances, a reckless extravagance and rift from his wife, meant he ceased to live at Drayton Manor, Staffordshire. These circumstances made him a stranger there in his final years. 

His last public appearance was the week before his death, attending St James's Hall to protest atrocities in Armenia. The Times wrote his obituary to include a statement that his death "left no gap in English public life...his career has closed in disappointment and futility." It added "he had much of his great father's impressive dignity, though without any of his stiffness, for which, indeed, he substituted a Bohemian easiness of manner."

Family
Peel married Lady Emily Hay, seventh daughter of George Hay, 8th Marquess of Tweeddale, on 13 January 1856. Twin daughters Gwendolin Cecilia and Agnes Helen (1860–1964) were born in 1860, followed by Victoria Alexandrina Julia (1865–1935), Robert (1867–1925) and Evelyn Emily (1869–1960). On 9 May 1895, aged 73, Peel died from hæmorrhage on the brain. He was found dead in his bedroom at 12 Stratton Street, London. His valet had to enter his room via a window and summoned his doctor from Harley Street. He was buried at Drayton Bassett's Anglican church on 16 May. His son Robert succeeded in the baronetcy, and he left three daughters. Lady Peel died in April 1924 in Florence at the age of 88.

References

External links 
 

1822 births
1895 deaths
Knights Grand Cross of the Order of the Bath
Peel baronets
Children of prime ministers of the United Kingdom
Lords of the Admiralty
Conservative Party (UK) MPs for English constituencies
Liberal Party (UK) MPs for English constituencies
People educated at Harrow School
Alumni of Christ Church, Oxford
Members of the Privy Council of the United Kingdom
Members of the Privy Council of Ireland
UK MPs 1847–1852
UK MPs 1852–1857
UK MPs 1857–1859
UK MPs 1859–1865
UK MPs 1865–1868
UK MPs 1868–1874
UK MPs 1874–1880
UK MPs 1880–1885
UK MPs 1885–1886
Politics of Blackburn with Darwen
Robert
Chief Secretaries for Ireland
English cricketers
Marylebone Cricket Club cricketers